The Manbij Military Council (MMC) is a coalition established by several groups in the Syrian Democratic Forces (SDF), primarily the Northern Sun Battalion, on 2 April 2016 at the Tishrin Dam on the Euphrates. The MMC led the SDF's Manbij offensive from June 2016 that led to the capture of the city of Manbij from the Islamic State of Iraq and the Levant two months later. Most fighters in the MMC are from Manbij and the surrounding areas.

History

2016

The Manbij offensive has included the Manbij Military Council, US special operations forces, and minimal YPG and YPJ involvement assisted by US-led coalition airstrikes. The SDF fighters are mostly Arabs. During the offensive, an SDF fighter gave his perspective as "we have Arabs, Kurds, nobody knows how many exactly, we all work under the SDF-forces".

On 5 April 2016, a civilian council was formed in the town of Sarrin by individuals originally from Manbij who had fled when Islamic State of Iraq and the Levant (ISIL) took over. The council consists of Arabs, Kurds, Turkmen, and Circassians, and was created to administer Manbij after its capture.

The commander of the Manbij Military Council, Abu Layla, died of wounds he suffered from gunshots in the Manbij front against the Islamic State. He was succeeded by Muhammad Mustafa ("Abu Adel").

On 19 August 2016, the Manbij Military Council issued a statement which announced that it was taking over the security of Manbij city center and villages from the YPG and YPJ, though some of their fighters remained to continue to provide training and other support duties.

In early November 2016, a 'battalion' from the Sham Legion defected and joined the MMC.

On 17 November 2016, the rest of the YPG and YPJ fighters left Manbij, leaving the security of the area and training of troops fully to the council.

2017
On 2 March 2017, the Manbij Military Council handed over a vast expanse of territory west of Manbij to the Syrian Army to create a buffer zone between the SDF and Turkish-backed rebels. They released a statement saying that "Defending the civilians and protecting them from the adverse impact of the war, ensuring the security of Manbij and frustrating the invasion plans of the Turkish army against Syrian soil are the goals we have taken for all the peoples living on the lands of Syria," and that

and

On 17 April 2017, it was announced that 200 fighters from the council would participate in the Battle of Tabqa to take al-Thawra, part of the larger Raqqa campaign. On 24 May 2017, an additional 2,200 fighters were sent for the fourth phase of the campaign.

The Manbij Military Council fought in the Battle of Raqqa since 6 June 2017. On 29 August, Adnan Abu Amjad, general commander of the Manbij Military Council, was killed in action during the battle.

On 17 September 2017, Muhammad Mustafa Ali, also known by his nom de guerre "Abu Adel", was appointed the general commander of the Manbij Military Council as the successor of Adnan Abu Amjad. On 5 November 2017, Abu Adel was wounded by an IED of Harakat al-Qiyam, a rebel group in northern Syria.

On 27 November 2017, the Martyr Adnan Abu Amjad Regiment, consisting of 250 fighters was established, and joined the MMC.

References

Syrian Democratic Forces
Anti-ISIL factions in Syria
Military units and formations established in 2016
2016 establishments in Syria